James Joseph Saeed Moga (born 14 June 1983) is a South Sudanese former professional footballer who played as a striker. He is South Sudan's all-time top goalscorer, with six goals in 18 appearances.

Early life
James Joseph Saeed Moga was born on 14 June 1986 in the town of Nimule, South Sudan (then Sudan) immediately north of the South Sudan-Uganda border.

Club career

Sporting Goa
He signed for Sporting Clube de Goa in the 2011–12 season of the I-League, he is one of the top scorers for sporting clube de goa. Many other Indian clubs, including Pune FC, sought to sign him next season because of his scoring ability in almost every match.

Pune
On 23 June 2012 it was officially confirmed that Moga had signed for Pune F.C. of the I-League on a one-year deal.
On 15 December 2012, he struck twice to drub defending champions Dempo S.C. 5–1 at Nehru Stadium. On 22 December, he again struck a brace to beat Prayag United 2–1.

East Bengal
In June 2013, signed for Kolkata Giant East Bengal for one year. On 24 September 2013, Moga scored an important goal for East Bengal in 2013 AFC Cup Quarter final against Semen Padang FC in Indonesia, through which East Bengal qualified for semi final for the first time in their history.

Kator FC
In 2015, Moga signed for Kator FC which currently plays in the South Sudan Football Championship.

Mohammedan SC
In January 2016, Moga signed for Mohammedan which currently plays in the I-League 2nd Division.

Brothers Union
In May 2019 Moga joined Brothers Union of Bangladesh Premier League as a mid term transfer window signing.

International career
He scored South Sudan's first goal against Tusker from Kenya in the match celebrating South Sudan's independence from Sudan, whose national team he had represented in the past, appearing in 2002 and 2006 World Cup qualifying matches. He scored his first international goal in the 2–2 draw with Uganda, South Sudan's first ever official international match.

Career statistics

International goals for Sudan
Scores and results list Sudan's goal tally first.

International goals for South Sudan
Scores and results list South Sudan's goal tally first.

Honours

Club
Al-Merrikh
Sudan Cup –  Champions (1): 2006
Sporting Clube dé Goa
I-League 2nd Division –  Runners-up (1): 2010–11
Pune
I-League –  Runners-up (1): 2012–13
Mohammedan Sporting
Sikkim Gold Cup –  Champions (1): 2016

References

External links

1983 births
Living people
South Sudanese footballers
Sudan international footballers
South Sudan international footballers
South Sudanese expatriate footballers
Expatriate footballers in the United Arab Emirates
Expatriate footballers in Oman
Expatriate footballers in Bangladesh
Expatriate footballers in India
South Sudanese expatriate sportspeople in India
Association football forwards
Sporting Clube de Goa players
muscat Club players
I-League players
Dual internationalists (football)
Pune FC players
Mohammedan SC (Kolkata) players
east Bengal Club players
Rangdajied United F.C. players
Baniyas Club players
Al Rams Club players
UAE Pro League players
UAE First Division League players
Muktijoddha Sangsad KC players
Al-Hilal Club (Omdurman) players
Al-Merrikh SC players
Brothers Union players
Calcutta Football League players